Dieck is a surname. Notable people with the surname include:

 Alfred Dieck (1906–1989), German archaeologist
 Cameron Dieck, New York City ballet dancer
 Georg Dieck (1847–1925), German entomologist and botanist
 Tim Dieck (born 1996), German ice dancer